NGC 4244, also known as Caldwell 26, is an edge-on loose spiral galaxy in  the constellation Canes Venatici, and is part of the M94 Group or Canes Venatici I Group, a galaxy group relatively close to the Local Group containing the Milky Way. In the sky, it is located near the yellow naked-eye star, Beta Canum Venaticorum, but also near the barred spiral galaxy NGC 4151 and irregular galaxy NGC 4214.

With an apparent V-band magnitude of 10.18, NGC 4244 lies approximately 4.3 megaparsecs (14 million light years) away. A nuclear star cluster and halo is located near the centre of this galaxy.

See also 
 IC 5052 - a similar edge-on galaxy

Notes

References

External links

 

Unbarred spiral galaxies
4244
026b
Canes Venatici
M94 Group
039422